The Glenn House is a historic house at 653 Water Street in Batesville, Arkansas.  It is a -story wood-frame structure, five bays wide, with a side-gable roof and end chimneys.  A porch with balcony above extends across the middle three bays, and there is a cross gable at the center, above the upper and lower doorways.  The house is basically Greek Revival in character, although it has some later Victorian period alterations.  It was built in 1850 to house the academic facilities of the Soulesbury Institute, and was from 1873 occupied by four generations of the Glenn family.  It is one Batesville's most architecturally sophisticated houses.

The house was listed on the National Register of Historic Places in 1975.

See also
National Register of Historic Places listings in Independence County, Arkansas

References

Houses on the National Register of Historic Places in Arkansas
Greek Revival houses in Arkansas
Houses in Batesville, Arkansas
National Register of Historic Places in Independence County, Arkansas
Historic district contributing properties in Arkansas
1850 establishments in Arkansas
Houses completed in 1850
Victorian architecture in Arkansas